Leslie Elias Davies (born 29 October 1984) is a Welsh footballer who plays as a striker for Bangor 1876.

Career
Davies began his career with Caernarfon Town before signing for Bangor City. During his time with Bangor, Davies was dubbed "Bangor's Number 9", and was a popular figure with the fans, winning the BCFCSA Player of the Season for two successive years, whilst also getting voted into the team of the season by the league's managers in 2011–12.

Between 2005 and 2007, Davies played for Porthmadog, scoring 18 goals before returning to Bangor.

During his second spell with Bangor, Davies was nominated for the UEFA Player of the Year award in July 2012, after receiving the required single nomination from journalist Dave Jones of The Daily Post. On 8 August 2015, Bangor City announced that Davies had left the club to sign for Connah's Quay Nomads, and this was confirmed by The Nomads on Monday 10 August.

He made 79 competitive appearances for the Nomads, scoring 24 goals, before moving to Bala Town in May 2017.

Davies returned to Bangor for a third spell in May 2018. In January 2019, he signed for Llandudno.

In May 2019, Davies signed for Aberystwyth Town for the 2019–20 season.

Davies left Aberystwyth in June 2019, before the season started to sign for Bangor City phoenix club Bangor 1876.

International career
Davies has represented Wales at U18, U21 level and also as a semi-professional for their U23 team.

Style of play
Davies is well known for his strength and has earned the nickname "The Truck" as a result.

References

External links

Bangor City profile
Welsh Premier League profile

1984 births
Living people
Welsh footballers
Bangor City F.C. players
Porthmadog F.C. players
Wales under-21 international footballers
Wales under-23 international footballers
Wales youth international footballers
Footballers from Bangor, Gwynedd
Cymru Premier players
Connah's Quay Nomads F.C. players
Association football forwards
Aberystwyth Town F.C. players
Llandudno F.C. players
Bala Town F.C. players
Bangor 1876 F.C. players
Flint Town United F.C. players